Gikopoulos is a Greek surname, which means son of Ghica (Gikas). The female version of the name is Gikopoulou (Γκικόπούλου). Its Albanized form is Gjikopulli.

References 

Greek-language surnames
Surnames